Brother Bernhard ( or ) is a 1929 German film directed by Franz Seitz, Sr. and starring Vera Schmiterlöw, Walter Grüters and Will Dohm.

The film's art direction was by Willy Reiber. It was made at the Emelka Studios in Munich.

Cast
 Vera Schmiterlöw as Christine
 Walter Grüters as Bruder Bernhard
 Will Dohm as Gärtner Robert
 Ferdinand Martini as Bruder Wendelin
 Hermann Nesselträger as Ein Schneider
 Ludwig Rupert as Stief
 Georg Henrich as Prior
 Josef Eichheim as Der alte Knorr

References

External links

1929 films
Films of the Weimar Republic
Films directed by Franz Seitz
Bavaria Film films
German black-and-white films
1920s German films